is the seventh single by Japanese recording artist Aya Ueto. It was released on February 4, 2004 as the fourth and final single from Ueto's second studio album Message. The single was released in two formats: limited and standard editions, both issued with different covers.

Overview 

"Ai no Tame ni." was written, composed and produced by Tetsurō Oda, marking their first collaboration. The song served as theme song for the TV Asahi drama Ace o Nerae!, starring Ueto herself. Unlike her previous singles, which were all based on a darker, edgier concept, "Ai no Tame ni." is Ueto' first light-hearted, cheerful single. CDJournal described the song as a "fresh, juvenescent ska-pop track," while Barks complemented Oda for composing a song that fit the modern take of the drama on the original Ace o Nerae! manga perfectly.

The B-side, "Arigato," was also produced by Oda, and written by Oda protégé Akira Nakazawa. The single also includes a 1980s-inspired remix of "Binetsu."

Chart performance 
"Ai no Tame ni." debuted on the Oricon Daily Singles chart at number 7 on February 3, 2004 and climbed to number 4 on February 7, 2004. It peaked at number 6 on the Oricon Weekly Singles chart, with 31,006 copies sold in its first week. The single charted for fifteen weeks and has sold a total of 99,470 copies.

Track listing

Charts, certifications and sales

Charts

Certifications and sales

Release history

References 

2004 singles
Aya Ueto songs
Japanese television drama theme songs
Songs written by Tetsurō Oda
2004 songs